Allendorf is an unincorporated community in Osceola County, Iowa, United States. It is located on Highway 59, five miles east of Sibley, at 43.413270N, -95.64318W, adjacent to the Johnson Wilderness Area.

History
Allendorf was founded in 1895, possibly named after a town named Allendorf in Germany; the town was originally named Oliver. Allendorf's population was 13 in 1902, and 35 in 1925.

References

Unincorporated communities in Osceola County, Iowa
Unincorporated communities in Iowa
Populated places established in 1895
1895 establishments in Iowa